Diazepine is a seven-membered heterocyclic compound with two nitrogen atoms (e.g., in ring positions 1 and 2).

Types include:
 1,2-diazepine
 1,3-diazepine
 1,4-diazepine
 Benzodiazepines, a class of commonly used medications whose structure contains a 1,4-diazepine ring